Chris Lynn Davis Jr. (born November 4, 1990) is an American football coach and former player. He played college football at Auburn and was signed by the San Diego Chargers as an undrafted free agent in 2014. While at Auburn, he was responsible for the historic “Kick Six,” the final play of the 2013 Iron Bowl when he returned a field goal attempt over 100 yards to score a game winning touchdown with no time remaining.

High school career
Davis attended Woodlawn High School in Birmingham, Alabama. As a senior, he had 134 carries for 877 yards (6.5 ypc), eight catches for 185 yards, 472 kickoff return yards and 48 punt return yards. Defensively, he had 23 tackles and three pass breakups.

He was considered a three-star recruit by Rivals.com.

College career
Davis was involved in the 2013 Iron Bowl play referred to as "Kick Six." With one second left on the clock and the score tied at 28, Alabama placekicker Adam Griffith missed a 57-yard game-winning field goal attempt which was caught by Davis and returned 109 yards for a game-winning touchdown.

As a senior in 2013, Davis was named an All-American as a return specialist by the Sporting News and CBS Sports. He earned second-team All-SEC honors at cornerback.

Professional career

San Diego Chargers
Despite being projected as a 4th–5th round pick, Davis went undrafted in the 2014 NFL Draft. However, he was signed by the San Diego Chargers on May 10, 2014. Davis spent most of the year returning kicks averaging 25.1 yards per return. He ended the year with 15 tackles, a pass defended, and a forced fumble. On September 1, 2015, Davis was released.

San Francisco 49ers
Davis signed with the San Francisco 49ers' practice squad on November 3, 2015. He was promoted to the active roster on November 7, 2015.

On October 10, 2016, Davis was placed on injured reserve.

Birmingham Iron
In 2018, Davis signed with the Birmingham Iron of the Alliance of American Football for the 2019 season. He was placed on injured reserve before the start of the regular season, but was waived from injured reserve on March 4, 2019. He was added to the team's rights list and re-signed to a contract on March 25. He was activated from the rights list on March 26. The league ceased operations in April 2019.

In October 2019, Davis was selected by the Seattle Dragons of the XFL as part of the 2020 XFL Draft process.

Coaching career
In August 2020, Davis was named the cornerback coach for the Pinson Valley High School football team, joining former Alabama player and head coach Sam Shade.

References

External links
San Diego Chargers bio
 Auburn Tigers bio

1990 births
Living people
American football cornerbacks
American football return specialists
Auburn Tigers football players
San Diego Chargers players
San Francisco 49ers players
Players of American football from Birmingham, Alabama
Birmingham Iron players